Korb is a municipality in the Rems-Murr district, in Baden-Württemberg, Germany. It is located 3 km east of Waiblingen, and 15 km northeast of Stuttgart. Korb is known for the wines produced in the area.

History

Older History
The first known written mention dates from the year 1270. In an Esslingen document from the year 1270 is testified that the hospital in Esslingen has acquired land in Korb from the convent in Steinheim (Murr).

Middle Ages 
Only in 1270 Korb will appear in the said document again. During the Thirty Years' War 1618-1648 there was great distress, and Korb was partially totally uninhabited (1636-38). Peasant uprising (1514 " Poor Conrad ") and the French invasion (1797) made also great suffer for Korb.
Over the centuries the wine played a major role in the predominantly rural population. He made practically the main source of income.

Family History 
During the Thirty Years' War the city suffered severe population losses. A few families were able to escape through temporary escape, including the Singer family.

Modern History/Modern Times
Only the industrialization around the turn of the century made the change for Korb to the today residential community. Before had been a catastrophic phylloxera infestation, all the vine yards in the Remstal had to be burned.

Traffic
Korb is connected through the Bundesstraße 14 to the national road network. Coming from the north Korb is mostly connected about the exit Mundelsheim of the Bundesautobahn 81.

Buses that run frequently connect Korb with the Waiblingen station, as well as over Kleinheppach with Endersbach station to Weinstadt.

Notable peoples from Korb
Jakob Friedrich Weishaar (1775–1834), president of the chamber of deputies of the Württemberg Landtag
Alfred Leikam (1915–1992), Righteous among the Nations and mayor of Korb 1945 
Marco Fritz (born 1977), Football Bundesliga referee
Yvonne Englich (born 1979), international successful wrestler

Literature 
 Ernst, Gottlob: Korb Steinreinach, Die Geschichte zweier Weinbausiedlungen. Korb 1970
 Heinrich, Jörg: Kirchenbuch Korb, 1662 bis 1807. Abschrift, Karlsruhe 2010

References

Rems-Murr-Kreis